Marcahuasi is a plateau in the Andes Mountains, located 60 km east of Lima, on the mountain range that rises to the right bank of the Rímac River.

Discovery
The place was first investigated  by Daniel Ruzo during the 1950s and in an area of about 3 km2, several hundred curious shapes are found, which can be presumed as natural formations.

Features
The plateau originated from a volcanic reaction. Marcahuasi is home to a unique set of huge granite rocks with curious shapes resembling human faces, animals, and religious symbols. There are many theories as to their origins, including the assertion that their unusual shapes formed naturally through erosion. Some argued that they are sculptures shaped by ancient people but archaeologists clearly state that the shapes are the result of erosion over centuries. There are some small pre-Columbian structures, which are tombs of ancient people and some of which are robbed and vandalised.

There is also a collection of ruins on the north side of the plateau. Over 50 structures stand in varying states of decay. The doorways are very small, some three feet high. Most of the structures are narrow since the use of arches was not known, therefore spans had to be covered with suitable rock that may have been quarried locally. There are also what appear to be burial tombs on the outskirts of the settlement.

Gallery

See also
Badlands Guardian a feature that from the air bears a strong resemblance to a human head wearing a full Native American headdress
'Face on Mars', photographed by Viking 1 in 1976
Old Man of the Mountain, rock profile in New Hampshire
Old Man of Hoy a rock pillar off Scotland that resembles a standing man
Pareidolia, the phenomena of perceiving faces in random patterns
 Marcahuasi (Markawasi) Stone Forest, Lima, Peru on Google Maps

References

Bibliography
 Mazzotti Lopez, Daniel (2001). A mochila en Perú (Backpacking in Peru) Peruvian explorers.
 Video: Marcahuasi: Enigmatic Stones in the Peruvian Andes
Doore, Kathy (2008), Markawasi: Peru's Inexplicable Stone Forest
Williamson, George Hunt (1973), Road in the Sky

Landforms of Lima Region
Geomorphology
Plateaus of Peru
Rock formations of Peru